The South Devon Railway 2-4-0 locomotives were small 2-4-0T broad gauge locomotives operated on the South Devon Railway, mainly on its branch lines such as that to Ashburton.

On 1 February 1876, the South Devon Railway was amalgamated with the Great Western Railway. The locomotives were given numbers by their new owners, but continued to carry their names as well.

Locomotives

King

 King (1871–1878) GWR No. 2171
King was a small side-tank locomotive built by the Avonside Engine Company. It did not last long as a broad gauge locomotive, being converted to narrow gauge  in 1878. It then operated in this form until 1907 as GWR No. 2, after which it was sold to the Bute Works Supply Company.

Named after a monarch, see King.

Prince

 Prince (1871–1892) GWR No. 2137
Prince was similar to 0-6-0 Taurus, a small 2-4-0ST engine built by the Ince Forge Company three years earlier, works number 14 according to RCTS. It was converted to standard gauge in 1893 and operated in this form as GWR No. 1316 until 1899, after which it was used as a stationary engine and portable boiler at various locations including Crofton, Portreath and Dorchester Prisoner-of-war camp until finally dismantled in 1935.

For other uses of the name Prince, see Prince (disambiguation).

 Jupiter
 Mercury
 Saturn

Three more locomotives were under construction in 1876 when the South Devon Railway was amalgamated into the Great Western Railway. They were similar to Prince except for slightly smaller  dia ×  cylinders.

The parts had been supplied by the Ince Forge Company for erection at Newton Abbot, however the part built locomotives were taken to Swindon railway works where they were completed as side-tank locomotives 1298, 1299 and 1300. 1299 was fitted with a crane for work at Swindon in 1881 (withdrawn September 1936), while the other two were stationed at Exeter for working the Culm Valley Light Railway and withdrawn in 1926 (1298) and 1934 (1300).

The names are those of planets but were probably chosen for their mythological links, as many other South Devon Railway locomotives carried the names of gods. See Saturn, Mercury, Jupiter.

References

 
 
 
 
 Tiny, Broadsheet 13 & 14, Broad Gauge Society , 1985
 Railway company records can be consulted at The National Archives

External links
 Photograph of No 1299 as a crane tank circa 1928

Broad gauge (7 feet) railway locomotives
2-4-0T locomotives
South Devon Railway locomotives
Avonside locomotives
Railway locomotives introduced in 1871